South Palm Beach is a town located in Palm Beach County, Florida, United States. The town is situated on a barrier island between the Atlantic Ocean and the Intracoastal Waterway. The entire town is approximately 5/8th of a mile (1 km) long along South Ocean Boulevard (Florida State Road A1A), its only street. It is between the Town of Palm Beach to the north and the Town of Lantana and its public beach to the south. As of the 2020 census, the population was 1,471.

Geography

South Palm Beach is located at  (26.591746, –80.037525).

South Palm Beach is bordered to the north by the Town of Palm Beach; to the east by the Atlantic Ocean; to the west by the Intracoastal waterway (known locally as the Lake Worth Lagoon); and on the south by the town of Manalapan.

Demographics

2020 census

As of the 2020 United States census, there were 1,471 people, 754 households, and 341 families residing in the town.

2008
As of the census of 2008 (population updated from 2013), there were 1,138 full-time residents in 453 households and 196 families residing in the town. The seasonal (part-time) estimate for the town is 3,000 or more residents in the winter months. Currently, the town consists of 25 condominiums, 4 single-family houses and 15 townhouses. The racial makeup of the town was 99.28% White (97% were Non-Hispanic White,) 0.14% Native American and 0.57% Asian. Hispanic or Latino of any race were 2.29% of the population.

There were 453 households, out of which 2.2% had children under the age of 18 living with them, 38.6% were married couples living together, 3.5% had a female householder with no husband present, and 56.7% were non-families. 52.1% of all households were made up of individuals, and 28.5% had someone living alone who was 65 years of age or older. The average household size was 1.54 and the average family size was 2.14.

In the town, the population was spread out, with 2.6% under the age of 18, 1.4% from 18 to 24, 11.3% from 25 to 44, 30.5% from 45 to 64, and 54.2% who were 65 years of age or older. The median age was 67 years. For every 100 females, there were 75.2 males. For every 100 females aged 18 and over, there were 76.0 males.

The median income for a household in the town was US$39,375, and the median income for a family was $47,250. Males had a median income of $41,591 versus $30,536 for females. The per capita income for the town was $38,456. About 15.3% of families and 15.7% of the population were below the poverty line, including none of those under age 18 and 15.9% of those aged 65 or over.

As of 2000, English was the first language spoken by 92.96% of residents, Finnish by 3.90%, and French as a mother tongue made up 3.12% of the population.

Shore stabilization

From 2003 to 2016, there have been six shoreline and dune restoration projects for the town's beach. Since 2007, Palm Beach County has completed several engineering studies to evaluate long-term erosion control alternatives, including doing nothing.

The Town of Palm Beach completed its beach nourishment projects in 2016 pronouncing its "coastline is in pretty good shape." No shore stabilization work was performed in South Palm Beach. Plans called for a $5.6 million "Southern Palm Beach Island Comprehensive Shore Stabilization Project" during 2019 and 2020 that was designed to rebuild about 0.67 miles of the town's shoreline. In early 2019, the County determined that the project was "cost prohibitive" and officially withdrew a request for the needed permits from the Florida Department of Environmental Protection.

With assistance from the Town of Palm Beach, a smaller beach nourishment option by trucking sand to feed the eroding town's beachfront may be possible in early 2019. After more than ten years and a devastated shoreline - with several properties only having seawalls remaining against the ocean waves - rather than a beach stabilization project, a restoration of the beach by trucking in sand was conducted in 2021.

Economy

Business

Originally built in 1964, the Polynesian-inspired, 58-room Palm Beach Oceanfront Inn and its ocean-front restaurant Tides Bar and Grille, located at 3550 South Ocean Boulevard, made up the only commercial business establishment within the town of South Palm Beach. It was described as "one of the last vestiges of old Florida along A1A."
 
Kosova Realty bought the inn for $3.3 million in 2002 and named it Palm Beach Oceanfront Inn. Known to locals by its former name, the Hawaiian Inn, the two-story motel lost most of its beach during Hurricane Wilma in 2005 and was not being maintained.

A proposal by the Paloka family-owned-and-operated realty company to replace the inn with a luxury resort-style 12-story condominium-hotel built over two stories of parking was unanimously rejected by the South Palm Beach Town Council in October 2007. The established comprehensive plan limits new buildings to six-stories over one-level of parking.

On September 18, 2009, the Treasure Coast Regional Planning Council meeting expressed concerns about the redevelopment and recommended that the Town of Palm Beach should respond to negative opinions by its citizens prior to the adoption of the amendments, as well as ensure that development approval conditions address problems with the use, height limits, and negative impacts on the beaches.

The Paloka family tried to change the town codes to allow a bigger building such as a 14-story condominium and "were willing to build the town a public safety building and new town hall to sweeten the deal." They increased business at the property during 2011 and were planning capital improvements, but foreclosure proceedings began. Kosova Realty filed for Chapter 11 bankruptcy in March 2012.

In November 2012, the operation was purchased by Paragon Acquisition Group of Boca Raton, a distressed property development company, with plans to improve and revive the facility, as well as "possibility of a development project in the future." DDG then partnered with investor Gary Cohen of Paragon on the development. According to the CEO of developer DDG, Joseph A. McMillan, Jr., in 2012 a DDG affiliate paid $8.25 million for the  site. Although the property has received minor renovations and is being managed as a hotel and restaurant, the long-term prospects for it are for condominiums according to the CEO of Paragon.

The current zoning for oceanfront property in the town allows 33 units per acre, while a more dense project would require a referendum. Plans by DDG were announced for 30 residential units to be built above a one-story parking garage. The old motel and restaurant on the site were demolished in April 2016. Marketing for the new 30-unit building featured amenities such as concierge service, a dog park, and private jet service. In June 2018, the building "officially topped out, reaching its full height of seven stories." September 2019 marked the completion of the building.

References

External links

 Town of South Palm Beach Florida - community, departments, resources: agendas & minutes, calendar, documents, building dept. forms, etc.
News
 City-Data.com Comprehensive Statistical Data and more about South Palm Beach

Towns in Palm Beach County, Florida
Beaches of Palm Beach County, Florida
Towns in Florida
Populated coastal places in Florida on the Atlantic Ocean
Beaches of Florida